Riku (also Romanized as Rīkū; also known as Bāghū, Rīgū, and Rīgū Jahānshāhī) is a village in Suza Rural District, Shahab District, Qeshm County, Hormozgan Province, Iran. At the 2006 census, its population was 333, in 63 families.

References 

Populated places in Qeshm County